Albiate is a town and commune in the province of Monza and Brianza. It borders on the communes of Seregno, Carate Brianza, Sovico, Triuggio, Lissone.

Cities and towns in Lombardy
Populated places on Brianza